Cratoxylum sumatranum is a species of flowering plant in the Hypericaceae family. It is indigenous to Southeast Asia, including Burma, Indochina, Thailand, Malaysia, Sumatra, Java, Lesser Sunda Islands, Borneo, Philippines and Sulawesi.

The tree may grow up to 51 meters tall and 80 centimeters diameter at breast height, with cracked and fissured bark. The stems produce whitish-yellowish latex. The leaves have an opposite arrangement, are simple, elliptic and a glossy rich green. Its flowers are 5-parted and clustered on terminal panicles. They are small (approximately 8mm in diameter), reddish with white linings around the petals. The fruits, which appear in July, are approximately 8mm long, yellow-brown-black capsules, filled with many small winged seeds.

The plant's leaves and bark have medicinal uses. Its timber is suitable for light construction, furniture, carving, firewood and charcoal production.

Local names include Kansilay, Lakansilay and Guyong-guyong in the Philippines, and Irat, Geronggang, Manding, Mentialing, Serungan and Serungan mampat in Borneo.

Subspecies
Three subspecies are recorded:
 C. sumatranum subsp. blancoi  - Philippines
 C. sumatranum subsp. neriifolium  - Indo-China
 C. sumatranum subsp. sumatranum - the nominate infraspecific - Malesia

References

External links
 Cratoxylum sumatranum on PhytoImages

sumatranum
Trees of Indo-China
Trees of Malesia
Least concern plants